The Guam women's national under-17 football team is the representative football team for Guam at the age of under-17. The team plays AFC U-17 Women's Asian Cup. They yet to qualified in the FIFA U-17 Women's World Cup.

Team image

Nicknames
The Guam women's national under-17 football team has been known or nicknamed as the Masakåda.

Home stadium
Guam plays their home matches on the GFA National Training Center and others stadiums.

History
The Guam women's national under-17 football team have played their debut game on 16 April 2005 at Namhae, South Korea versus Bangladesh which won by 1-0 goal. The team have qualified two times in the AFC U-17 Women's Asian Cup first in 2005 and second in 2013 both of are finished in the group stages. The nation have not yet qualified in the FIFA U-17 Women's World Cup.

Current squad
The following squad was announced for 2019 AFC U-16 Women's Championship qualification.

Fixtures and results 
Legend

2018

2023

Competitive records
 Champions   Runners-up   Third place   Fourth place

FIFA U-17 Women's World Cup

*Draws include knockout matches decided on penalty kicks.

AFC U-17 Women's Asian Cup 

*Draws include knockout matches decided on penalty kicks.

AFC U-17 Women's Asian Cup qualification 

*Draws include knockout matches decided on penalty kicks.

References

Asian women's national association football teams
Football in Guam
1997 establishments in Guam
W